Đurovski (also transliterated Djurovski) or  Ǵurovski (also transliterated Gjurovski), is a South Slavic surname derived from Serbian Đurić/Đurović, and may refer to:
 Boško Đurovski (born 1961), Macedonian football player, Milko's brother
 Milko Đurovski (born 1963), Macedonian football player, Boško's brother, Mario's father
 Mario Đurovski (born 1985), Macedonian football player, Milko's son.

See also
 Đuro, a South Slavic male given name

Serbian surnames